The 1984 E3 Harelbeke was the 27th edition of the E3 Harelbeke cycle race and was held on 24 March 1984. The race started and finished in Harelbeke. The race was won by Bert Oosterbosch of the Panasonic team.

General classification

References

1984 in Belgian sport
1984